Roger Swerts (born 28 December 1942) is a Belgian former road bicycle racer. As an amateur he placed 18th in the individual road race at the 1964 Summer Olympics and won a bronze medal at the 1965 UCI Road World Championships. He turned professional later in 1965.

Palmarès

1964
1st, Stage 10, Tour de l'Avenir
1965
3rd, World Road Race Championships
1968
1st, Stage 6, Volta a Catalunya
1969
1st, Züri-Metzgete
1971
1st, Nationale Sluitingsprijs
1972
1st, Gent–Wevelgem
1st, Grand Prix de Forli
1st, Grand Prix des Nations
1st, Trofeo Baracchi
1st, Stage 14, Giro d'Italia
1st, Overall, Tour of Belgium
1st, Stages 4 & 5b
1973
1st, Druivenkoers Overijse
1st, Prologue, Giro d'Italia
1st, Stage 5b, Tirreno–Adriatico
1st, Stage 2, Tour of Belgium
9th, Overall, Vuelta a España
1st, Stage 6a
1974
 Road Race Championship
1st, Overall, Tour of Belgium
10th, Overall, Vuelta a España
1st, Prologue, Stages 8 & 12
1975
1st, Prologue, Vuelta a España

References

External links

1942 births
Belgian male cyclists
Living people
Olympic cyclists of Belgium
Cyclists at the 1964 Summer Olympics
Belgian Giro d'Italia stage winners
Belgian Vuelta a España stage winners
People from Heusden-Zolder
Cyclists from Limburg (Belgium)